Ousipalia is a genus of beetles belonging to the family Staphylinidae.

The species of this genus are found in Europe.

Species:
 Ousipalia altissima (Bernhauer, 1931) 
 Ousipalia caesula (Erichson, 1839)

References

Staphylinidae
Staphylinidae genera